Oenopota cunninghami is a species of sea snail, a marine gastropod mollusk in the family Mangeliidae.

Description
The size of the shell varies between 6 mm and 10 mm.

Distribution
This species occurs off the Falkland Islands, Argentina and Chile.

References

External links
 
 Forcelli (2000), Molluscos Magallanicos

cunninghami
Gastropods described in 1881